Vladimir Sergeevich Gulevich (18 November 1867 – 6 September 1933) was a Russian Empire and Soviet biochemist who first isolated carnitine from mammalian muscle.

Biography
Gulevich graduated in 1890 and received the degree of doctor of medicine in 1896 from the department of medicine of Moscow State University. From 1899 to 1900 he was a professor at the University of Kharkov. From 1900, he joined the Moscow State University where he was rector for a brief period of time in 1919.  
Vladimir Sergeevich Gulevich was elected member of Leopoldina in 1928. He was a full member of the USSR Academy of Sciences since 1929.

References

External links
Biography (Russian)

1867 births
1933 deaths
Biochemists from the Russian Empire
Full Members of the USSR Academy of Sciences
Professorships at the Imperial Moscow University
Academic staff of Moscow State University
Imperial Moscow University alumni
Rectors of Moscow State University